Lansing Center, officially the Lansing Convention Center, is the primary and largest convention center in Lansing, Michigan. The center is located along Michigan Avenue, with its western facade fronting the Grand River. The center's location includes a riverfront plaza that has been home to outdoor events. It is also directly connected to the Lansing Radisson Hotel by an enclosed, climate-controlled skybridge spanning the Grand River. Since 1996, Lansing Center has been managed by the non-profit Lansing Entertainment & Public Facilities Authority (LEPFA).

The center has a total square footage of 124,118 (11,531 m²), of which 71,760 ft² (6,667 m²) is column-free exhibit space.  

Designed by Hellmuth, Obata & Kassabaum (HOK), the center was opened in 1987, and renovated and expanded in 1995 with Hobbs + Black Associates as the renovation architects. The center currently holds  of space, including a main exhibition hall, meeting rooms, conference centers, banquet facilities, a restaurants and lounge, a full kitchen, and a 500-space underground parking garage.

The center underwent its first extensive renovation since the 1995 addition in 2007 and 2008. The renovation included cosmetic upgrades, as well as structural upgrades.

External links
 Lansing Center Official Website
 Lansing Entertainment & Public Facilities Authority (LEPFA)

Buildings and structures completed in 1987
Convention centers in Michigan
Economy of Lansing, Michigan
Buildings and structures in Lansing, Michigan
Tourist attractions in Lansing, Michigan
Event venues established in 1987
HOK (firm) buildings